Weil am Rhein Gartenstadt station is a railway station in the municipality of Weil am Rhein, in Baden-Württemberg, Germany. It is located on the standard gauge Weil am Rhein–Lörrach line of Deutsche Bahn.

Services
 the following services stop at Weil am Rhein Gartenstadt:

References

External links
 
 

Railway stations in Baden-Württemberg
Buildings and structures in Lörrach (district)